Dear Miss Phoebe is a musical with a book by Christopher Hassall and music by Harry Parr-Davies. It is based on the play Quality Street by J.M. Barrie.

It premiered at the Theatre Royal, Birmingham before transferring to the Phoenix Theatre in London's West End, where it ran for 283 performances between 13 October 1950 and 16 June 1951. The original London cast included Carol Raye, Peter Graves, Olga Lindo,  Moya Nugent, Gretchen Franklin and Noel Dyson.

References

Bibliography
 Wearing, J. P. The London Stage 1950-1959: A Calendar of Productions, Performers, and Personnel.  Rowman & Littlefield, 2014.

1950 musicals
British musicals
West End musicals
Musicals based on plays